Luzhin Strait (or Third Kuril Strait) is a stretch of sea which separates Antsiferov from the Paramushir coast.

Gymnelus soldatovi (Eelpout) have been found at a depth of 100 m. in the strait.

Notes

Straits of the Kuril Islands
Paramushir